Helen L. Hicks Harb (February 11, 1911 – December 16, 1974) was an American professional golfer and one of 13 founders of the LPGA in 1950.

Biography
Hicks was born in Cedarhurst, New York. She began playing golf at the age of 15, after being taught by her father. She attended Lawrence High School, where she played basketball for her school's team while simultaneously competing and winning such tournaments as the Junior Girls' Championship of the Metropolitan Women's Golf Association. She had a successful amateur career, reaching the finals of the U.S. Women's Amateur twice. She beat Glenna Collett Vare in 1931 and lost to Virginia Van Wie in 1933. She won several other amateur tournaments and played on the first U.S. Curtis Cup team in 1932.

In 1934, Hicks became one of the first women to turned professional; signing with the Wilson Sporting Goods Company to promote their golf equipment.

Hicks won two tournaments as a professional that are now considered LPGA major championships: the 1937 Women's Western Open and the 1940 Titleholders Championship. From 1938 to 1948, she competed as Helen Hicks Harb after marrying Whitney Harb.

In 1950, Hicks was one of 13 women that founded the LPGA.

Hicks died of throat cancer in 1974.

Hicks is sometimes confused with contemporary Betty Hicks who won the 1941 U.S. Women's Amateur.

Tournament wins
this list is incomplete
 1929 Canadian Women's Amateur
 1930 New York State Women’s Amateur
 1931 U.S. Women's Amateur, Metropolitan Women's Amateur, Women's Eastern Championship, New York State Women’s Amateur
 1933 Metropolitan Women's Amateur, New York State Women’s Amateur
 1937 Women's Western Open
 1940 Titleholders Championship

Major championships

Wins (2)

Team appearances
Amateur
 Curtis Cup (representing the United States): 1932 (winners)

References

External links

LPGA founders' profiles
Helen Hicks at Flickr Commons via Boston Public Library

American female golfers
LPGA Tour golfers
Winners of ladies' major amateur golf championships
Winners of LPGA major golf championships
Golfers from New York (state)
People from Cedarhurst, New York
1911 births
1974 deaths
20th-century American women
20th-century American people